Iceberg B-9 was an iceberg that calved from Antarctica in 1987. This calving took place immediately east of the future calving site of Iceberg B-15; it carried away Little America V which had been closed in December 1959.
Starting in October 1987, Iceberg B-9 drifted for 22 months, covering  on its journey. Initially, B-9 moved northwest for seven months, before being drawn southward by a subsurface current that eventually led to its colliding with the Ross Ice Shelf in August 1988. It then made a  radius gyre before resuming its northwest drift. In early August 1989, B-9 broke into three large pieces north of Cape Adare. These pieces were designated as B-9A, B-9B, and B-9C, .

In December 2003, it had made its way north and passed South Georgia Island to the east.

B-9B drifted toward the Mertz Glacier on the George V Coast, where it came to rest next to the glacier and remained there for eighteen years.

By December 2011, Iceberg B-9B had made its way into Commonwealth Bay and had broken up into three major pieces, parts of which froze to the seabed. The huge iceberg prevented three tourist ships, from reaching Antarctica; they had been intended to mark the centenary of the polar voyage of Australian explorer Douglas Mawson who had landed at Cape Denison on January 8, 1912, and constructed a complex of huts, which remain standing. These ships attempted to reach the cape, but had to turn back, in light of unusually harsh conditions caused by B-9B's position in the bay. A spokeswoman from the Australian government's Antarctic division observed, "There [are] unusual ice conditions ... affecting all the tourist ships that are going down there[,] because the tourist ships don't have ice-breaking capabilities, and they also don't have choppers, so their ability to get anywhere near the Mawson's huts area is basically stopped." In 2011, Amy Coopes from the Agence France-Presse expected that Iceberg B-9B could remain in Commonwealth Bay for the next decade. In 2018, B-9B still remains in the Commonwealth Bay, surrounded by other tabular icebergs.

See also
List of recorded icebergs by area

References

External links
 National Geographic
 IFL Science

B-9
Geography of Antarctica